The Kitsap Regional Library is a public library system in Kitsap County, Washington. Founded in 1944, the library system serves over 260,000 Kitsap residents with nine locations across the county and through a variety of outreach services. 
 
The Library provides access to over 400,000 items in its physical collection as well as access to downloadable eBooks, audiobooks, magazines and music. Library patrons can also access popular digital resources such as AllData Repair, Ancestry.com, Consumer Reports, Learning Express and Mango Languages.

Kitsap Regional Library is a primarily tax-funded organization overseen by a five-member Board of Trustees. Board members represent the five geographic regions of Kitsap County - which include Bainbridge, Bremerton, North Kitsap, South Kitsap and Central Kitsap - and are appointed for five-year terms. 

Along with these funds, the Library relies on local civic organizations, eight Friends of the Library organizations, Bainbridge Library, Inc. and the Kitsap Regional Library Foundation, which contributes approximately $300,000 combined annually to support programs and the maintenance of Library spaces. Additionally, the efforts of these groups have made possible the building of a new library in Kingston and the building of a new library in Silverdale.

History 
 
Kitsap Regional Library represents the communities of Kitsap County, but it has its beginnings in the Bremerton Public Library, which was approved by the City of Bremerton in 1908. The Library was first located over the fire department’s horse stables before outgrowing its capacity.

Several moves to new facilities took place during the 1910s and 1920s; sufficient space was an ongoing challenge for the frequently used library. The community passed a bond measure in 1937 and with the help of a Works Progress Administration grant, the current building in downtown Bremerton was constructed. However, a county-wide need for library services was evident. By 1938, the Bremerton Public Library was used by approximately 15,000 individuals throughout the area; during this time, the population of Bremerton itself was 10,000 people.

Through a collaboration between the Bremerton Public Library and the Kitsap County Council of Parent-Teacher Associations, a levy was passed in 1944 to create a Kitsap County Rural Library District. The goal of this new system was to expand library services to areas outside of the City of Bremerton. The Kitsap County Rural Library District operated under its own budget and staff until 1955 when it merged with Bremerton Public Library, consolidating resources, budgets, staff and equipment.

At the date of its creation, Kitsap Regional Library included a regional service center at Bremerton; stations at Eglon, Retsil, Seabeck, Kingston, Erlands Point, Manchester, Navy Yard City, Port Gamble, Silverdale, Tracyton, Rolling Bay and Suquamish; and one branch library in Poulsbo. Two bookmobiles further extended service to rural areas. From 1955 until 1976, the system was headquartered in the historic downtown Bremerton location. However, demand for library services exceeded capacity and a new headquarters was built in 1976 at Sylvan Way. The building opened to the public in 1978.

Locations
Kitsap Regional Library serves Kitsap County through nine physical locations. Each location offers a collection of books, audiobooks, CDs and DVDs and other materials; access to computers and technology assistance; public meeting spaces; and classes and events that are free and open to all.

Bainbridge Island 

Bainbridge Island is home to the second public library in all of Puget Sound; a small library was housed above a mill store starting in 1863. Bainbridge Island has been a part of the Kitsap library systems since 1947. Today, the Bainbridge Island location is housed in a building designed in 1962 by local architect John Rudolph. The facility was expanded in 1982 and 1997 and refreshed in 2017. All building construction and expansion expenses were paid with privately raised funds. The facility is supported and maintained by Bainbridge Public Library, Inc, a registered nonprofit organization.

Downtown Bremerton 

The Downtown Bremerton location of Kitsap Regional Library is housed in a historic 1938 art deco building originally funded by the Works Progress Administration. This location acted as Bremerton’s main library until 1955 when it became the headquarters for the newly formed Kitsap Regional Library system. In 1978, a new library headquarters opened in East Bremerton and the downtown library was designated as a branch library. The City of Bremerton owns and maintains the building, which was renovated in 2007, while Kitsap Regional Library provides service with staff and materials.

Kingston 

An open house in a small cafeteria room behind a schoolhouse on July 10, 1945 marked the beginning of Kitsap Regional Library service in the Kingston community. In 1985, the Kingston location moved to a new community center in the vacated Bayside Community Church, which had been purchased by Kitsap County. This move was supported by capital improvement funds from a Library levy. In 2016, the Kingston location of the Kitsap Regional Library moved to the newly constructed Village Green Community Center, which is owned by the Metropolitan Park District of Kingston and also houses the Boys and Girls Club and a senior center.

Little Boston 

The Little Boston location began in 1974 on the Port Gamble S'Klallam Indian Reservation in North Kitsap County. During the first 15 years, the library was housed in a 600-square foot A-frame cabin. In 1988, the Port Gamble S'Klallam Tribe received a grant from the Library Services and Construction Act to build a modern library facility. The tribe donated land and, in April 1989, a new library opened its doors. Between 1989 and 2001, circulation increased 680 percent. Recognizing the need for a new and larger building, the tribe and Kitsap Regional Library joined in a capital campaign for an educational and cultural complex. The House of Knowledge Complex was built in 2007 and includes a longhouse, a Career and Education Center, Elders Center and the Little Boston location of the Library.

Manchester 
In July 1947, Mary J. Sanford, owner of the Manchester Shopping Mart and member of the Kitsap Regional Library board of trustees, donated a corner of the shopping mart for use as a library. Quickly gaining community support, the library grew and moved to a renovated chicken coop in 1948. The library then moved again, to a 16-by-24 modular building at the Port of Manchester in 1953. The Friends of the Library received designation as a nonprofit organization in 1976 and two years later, were able to successfully secure a Farmers Home Administration grant which allowed for the construction of a permanent building that opened in 1954. With collections, staff and interior furnishings provided by Kitsap Regional Library, the current Manchester library location opened for business in September of 1980. The community room was added in 1994.

Through the efforts of the Friends of the Manchester Library, the Manchester branch began a new chapter in 2022, with renovations that expanded the library to 3,375 square feet. These renovations created more reading space for adults, larger areas for kids and teens, enlarged the meeting space and updated the shelving, paint and carpet in the interior. 

The Manchester location benefits from its surrounding gardens, which the Long Lake Garden Club and the Friends of the Library design and maintain. The gardens are an active teaching space that demonstrates water-wise, sustainable gardening techniques and educates the public on local flora. The Manchester location building is currently owned and maintained by its Friends of the Library group; the property on which it is located is owned by the Port of Manchester.

Port Orchard 

In 1924, public library service began in Port Orchard with a small library inside the Town Hall, and in 1947, it moved to a new municipal building. To increase service and resources to the community, the City of Port Orchard joined the Kitsap Regional Library system in 1964. Services were offered in what is now the Sidney Museum and Gallery. By 1984, there was a need for additional space and the City purchased the old town post office for library use. This facility, owned and maintained by the City of Port Orchard, is still currently in use, having undergone privately funded additions and remodels in 1995 and 2013 to provide dedicated spaces for children and meetings.

Poulsbo 

The Poulsbo community has had a library since 1918 when the local Civic Club founded the community’s first public library with support from the town council. In 1946, the library contracted with the Kitsap County Rural Library District. In 1959, a levy was passed to support a new building on a town-owned lot. The City of Poulsbo managed the library until the mid-1980s when the city voted to join the Kitsap Regional Library’s system. In 1998, voters of North Kitsap approved a bond measure to expand and remodel the Poulsbo location’s library. The new building opened in 2001 and is owned and maintained by The Kitsap Regional Library. The Poulsbo location houses a unique Scandinavian Collection with volumes ranging from Icelandic phrasebooks to Swedish interior design to children’s books. It also is home to a collection of Foundation Center materials.

Silverdale 

Silverdale has had a library since 1945 when the Kitsap County Rural Library District was formed. In 1946, the Silverdale Library Committee remodeled a 16-by-16-foot Army surplus building for use as the library. By 1958, the small building was inadequate and volunteers remodeled and expanded the building. In 1970, the Friends of the Silverdale Library launched a building campaign and in just 6 months, money was raised for a 1,000-square-foot library.

The Silverdale community grew significantly in the 1970s due to the presence of the Bangor Naval Base. With an increased need for library services, the Silverdale Library joined the Kitsap Regional Library system so the library could qualify for Trident Impact Funds. These funds helped expand the Silverdale location in 1980 to its current size. 

In 2015, the Kitsap Regional Library Foundation and the Friends started the Capital Campaign for a New Library in Silverdale, raising the $5.5 million needed to build a new library. Kitsap Regional Library partnered with the Central Kitsap School District in 2018 to move the Silverdale branch to the south end of the Central Kitsap High School. The 13,772 square foot new building opened in 2022.

Sylvan Way 

Sylvan Way is the largest location within Kitsap Regional Library and includes the administrative center for the system. The 35,000-square-foot building was completed in 1978 after a countywide bond measure was approved by voters. Approximately half of this space is dedicated to providing public library services, while the other half is home to Kitsap Regional Library’s collection and technical services, outreach, IT, human resources, communications and administrative departments. Kitsap Regional Library’s location at Sylvan Way is also home to the Puget Sound Genealogical Society and a Northwest History Reference Collection.

Bookmobile 

The Library also offers Bookmobile services. Bookmobile services in Kitsap County began in 1947 with "Molly," the Library’s first bookmobile. A second bookmobile, "Little Chief," was added in 1954. Both bookmobiles ran until they were replaced by "Buttercup." A major fundraising effort in 2008 resulted in the purchase of the most recent bookmobile, "Violet." Bookmobile service was discontinued in 2018.

Programs and Services

Programs

Summer Learning 

Summer Learning provides children, teens and adults the opportunity to learn and explore during the summer months. While still promoting reading Summer Learning also incorporates STEM classes, community events and other opportunities to provide a multi-faceted experience to participants. Summer Learning is supported by the Kitsap Regional Library Foundation and Friends of the Library groups, as well as by partnerships with community organizations and businesses.

One Book, One Community 
Each year, Kitsap Regional Library’s One Book, One Community program encourages the reading and discussing of a single book. The Library seeks a title that is thought-provoking.

Beyond selecting thoughtful and engaging titles, One Book, One Community program strives to reach new audiences within the region. In 2014, Kitsap Regional Library was selected as a John Cotton Dana Award for its Traveling Book Campaign, which utilized technology and guerrilla marketing to draw awareness within the local community to the One Book programs. Copies of the 2014 title, "The Leisure Seeker", by Michael Zadoorian were placed around the community; individuals who discovered copies of the book were encouraged to read and share.

Make, Do, Share 

In 2015, Kitsap Regional Library received a three-year National Leadership grant from the Institute of Museum and Library Services to design and implement a sustainable model of STEM programming for all public libraries. The project, titled Make Do Share, collects tools and resources to support staff in planning, facilitating and improving STEM programs for youth.

To the Library 
To the Library is an ongoing program that brings third-graders across Kitsap County to visit their Library location for a field trip. During their field trip, students explore the library, meet staff and learn about collections and resources. The Library works closely with community partners, from schools to local businesses and nonprofits, to offer this program throughout the county.

Library of Things 
In addition to books, movies, music and other traditional library loans, Kitsap Regional Library offers book group kits, loans on Discover Passes to visit Washington state parks, early learning kits for young children, STEM learning kits for children in grades 3-5, VOX readers that turn any book into an audiobook, a free seed library (at the Port Orchard and Manchester branches), ukuleles, and video games.

Services

Initiatives 

In early 2016, staff at Kitsap Regional Library analyzed existing data on Kitsap County to establish a foundation of knowledge about the community. Based on this study, the Library held 65 "community conversations" with groups and individuals throughout the County. The goal behind these conversations is to better understand the needs of the community beyond the Library.

Funding

Foundation 

Kitsap Regional Library Foundation’s role is to financially support the Library’s mission and vision for the Kitsap community. Founded in 1991 and governed by a Board of Directors, the Foundation is a 501(c)(3) corporation qualified to receive tax-deductible donations. They raise money from individuals, foundations, businesses and community organizations to ensure continued support for essential library programs and services not covered by public funds. These programs and services are only possible because of donations.

Friends groups 

Kitsap Regional Library receives support from seven active Friends of the Library groups: Bainbridge Island; Kingston; Manchester; Port Orchard; Poulsbo; Silverdale; and East Bremerton (Sylvan Way). The Friends groups are composed of dedicated volunteers whose work, which includes coordinating book sales and fundraising events, provides funding for Library operational and programming expenses.

Building ownership 

Kitsap Regional Library currently owns two of its library facilities: the Poulsbo and Sylvan Way locations. The facilities in downtown Bremerton and Port Orchard are owned by the city in which they are located. The remaining locations are owned by separate entities: the Little Boston location is owned by the Port Gamble S’Klallam Tribe; the Kingston location is owned by the Metropolitan Parks District; the Manchester Location is owned by the Manchester Friends of the Library, the Silverdale location is owned by the Central Kitsap School District and the Bainbridge Island location is owned by Bainbridge Island Public Library, Inc. Kitsap Regional Library provides staffing, library services and resources and non-structural, routine maintenance for each location.

Grants and awards

Grants 

 Paul Allen Family Foundation Grant, 2013
 National Leadership Grant for Libraries, 2015

Awards 

 John Cotton Dana Award, 2014 2018
 LibraryAware Community Award Honoree, 2014
  National Medal finalist, Institute of Museum and Library Services, 2016
 PR xChange Awards, Library Leadership and Management Association, American Library Association, 2011-2013, 2015-2017

References

External links
 
 Bainbridge Public Library, Inc.
 Metropolitan Park District
 Kitsap Regional Library Foundation

County library systems in Washington (state)
Education in Kitsap County, Washington